Sasa may refer to:

People
 Saša, a given name
 Genjū Sasa (1900–1959), Japanese film director and critic
 Sa'sa'a bin Sohan (598–666), a companion of Imam Ali revered by Shia Muslims
 Sasa (politician), special envoy to the United Nations for the national legislative body (CRPH) of Myanmar
 Chung Hsin-yu (also known as Sasa), Taiwanese host and actress

Places
 Sa'sa', a Palestinian village depopulated during the 1948 Arab–Israeli War
 Sasa, Israel, a kibbutz in Galilee, Israel
 Sasa, North Macedonia, a village in the Makedonska Kamenica Municipality
 Sa'sa', Syria, a town in the Rif Dimashq Governorate

Other uses
 Sasa (dance), a Samoan dance
 Sasa (plant), a genus of bamboo
 Sasa (video game), an arcade video game released for the MSX1
 Solvent-accessible surface area, the surface area of a biomolecule that is accessible to a solvent
 Sa Sa International Holdings, a Hong Kong chainstore
 Shekere, a musical instrument also known as "sasa" or "saasaa"

See also
 Sása (disambiguation), several villages in Slovakia
 Șasa (disambiguation), several places in Romania
 Sașa (disambiguation), several places in Romania
 SASA (disambiguation)